The Occupy Music Tour was an 11-date only concert tour in Europe by American R&B/soul singer D'Angelo. The tour both started and ended in Stockholm, Sweden at the Filadelfiakyrkan. It started on January 26, and ended with a final show on February 10. The singer performed songs from his previous albums and premiered new songs which may appear on his highly anticipated up-coming 2012 album, Black Messiah''.

Background
In late October 2011, two concerts were scheduled for January 30 and 31, 2012 at club Paradiso in Amsterdam, The Netherlands. Tickets went on sale on November 5 and were sold out within 24 hours.

In an interview with Pitchfork Media, drummer ?uestlove spoke on the new album and up-coming concerts; he stated:

For the upcoming tour, he scheduled concerts in Europe from January 26 to early February in London, Paris, Stockholm, Oslo, Copenhagen, Amsterdam and Zurich. The band includes Pino Palladino, Chris "Daddy" Dave, Kendra Foster, Jermaine Holmes, Ray Angry, Jesse Johnson of The Time and others. He performed 4 new songs: "Sugah Daddy", "Ain't That Easy", "Another Life" and "The Charade". According to people that visited the concert, the new songs were well received.

Opening acts
 Jean Grae (Paris)
 Furlan Felter (Amsterdam)

Setlist
"Playa Playa"
"Feel Like Makin' Love"
"Ain't That Easy" (New)
"Devil's Pie"
"Chicken Grease"
"The Line" (Intro)
"The Root"
"The Charade" (New)
"I've Been Watching You (Move Your Sexy Body)"
"Sh*t, Damn, Motherf*cker"
"Medley: "Jonz in My Bonz"/"Spanish Joint"
"Me and Those Dreamin' Eyes of Mine"/"Crusin'"
"Higher"/"One Mo'Gin"/"Lady"
"Untitled (How Does It Feel)"
"Another Life" (New)
"Sugah Daddy" (New)
"Space Oddity"
"Brown Sugar"

The Band (D'Angelo and The Vanguard)
 Vocals, Electric Piano, Guitar: D'Angelo
 Keyboards: Ray Angry
 Guitar I: Jesse Johnson
 Guitar II: Isaiah Sharkey
 Bass Guitar: Pino Palladino
 Drums: Chris Dave
 Percussion: Robert Lumzy
 Background vocals: Jermaine Holmes, Kendra Foster, Charles Middleton

Tour dates

Cancellations and rescheduled shows

References

External links
myspace.com-dangelo
okayplayer.com-dangelo

2012 concert tours
D'Angelo concert tours